Jason Powell is an American politician. A Democrat, he is a member of the Tennessee House of Representatives. He has served as the representative for State House District 53 since 2013.

Tennessee's State House District 53 is located at Davidson County and includes the area along the Nolensville Pike corridor from Berry Hill to Cane Ridge in Nashville.

Background 
In 2017, he was legislator that revolved around the state Government, Business and Utilities. Powell delved into these committee assignments from 2012 to 2017.

Early life 
Powell was born January 25, 1978, in Nashville, TN.

He married Heather and had two children named Sophie and Hawkes

Character 
Powell's father died when he was five years old. Through this trial, Jason learned the hard work and commitment to faith from his mother, Mary. She was a single mom and a registered nurse who worked long hours in order provide for Jason and his older sister.

Powell became a Little Brother in the Big Brothers Big Sisters program when he was seven. His Big Brother taught him a strong sense of self-confidence. This affected his academic, athletic, and extracurricular pursuits as a young man in a good way.

Education 
Powell attended one of Nashville's private schools called Montgomery Bell Academy. He attended Bell Academy from the beginning of 6th-12th grade year. Powell also attended college at University of Colorado and University of Memphis, he went in as a representative of the nation's largest college student government. Powell use to teach in public schools, he taught in schools among his District as well.

Powell has worked in real estate and nonprofit management.

Religion 
He attended Saint Matthias Church and he was also baptized there.

Powell considers himself Episcopal. The Episcopal Church is a member church of the worldwide Anglican Communion and is based in the United States with additional dioceses elsewhere. It is a mainline Christian denomination divided into nine provinces

Organization 

 He was a Former Board Number, Prevention Alliance of Tennessee.
 Licensed Real Estate Broker, State of Tennessee
 House Member of The 106th and 109th General Assembly
 Member, House Business and Utilities Committee

Memberships 

 Member, Caldwell-Abbay Hall Neighborhood Association

 Member, Cane Ridge Community Club

 Member, Crieve Hall Neighborhood Association

 Former Member, Education Report Card Committee, Nashville Area Chamber of Commerce

 Member, Fairlane Park Neighborhood Association

 Member, Glencliff Neighborhood Association

 Member, Greater Nashville Apartment Association

 Member, Greater Nashville Realtors

 Former Board Member, Nashville Emerging Leaders

 Former Board Member, Prevention Alliance of Tennessee

 Member, South Area Advisory Council, Nashville Area Chamber of Commerce

 Member, Tennessee Association of Realtors

 Member, Woodbine Neighborhood Association

References

External links
 
 Biography at Ballotpedia
  at Capitol.tn.gov
  at Powellfortennessee 
Legislative website

Living people
Democratic Party members of the Tennessee House of Representatives
1978 births
Politicians from Nashville, Tennessee
University of Colorado alumni
Tennessee State University alumni
21st-century American politicians